The Salvage for Victory campaign was a program launched by the US Federal Government in 1942 to salvage materials for the American war effort in World War II.

On January 10, 1942, the US Office of Production Management sent pledge cards to retail stores asking them to participate in the effort by saving things like waste paper, scrap metal, old rags, and rubber. Later that month, the Bureau of Industrial Conservation of the War Production Board asked all American mayors to salvage the same kinds of materials from municipal dumps and incinerators. 

In New York City, the Department of Sanitation began picking up materials collected for the drive outside of homes and apartment buildings at 11:00 am Sunday mornings.

References

External links

Salvage for Victory poster, another
Loading household salvage in Salvage for Victory truck

United States home front during World War II